DNA polymerase epsilon subunit 3 is an enzyme that in humans is encoded by the POLE3 gene.

POLE3 is a histone-fold protein that interacts with other histone-fold proteins to bind DNA in a sequence-independent manner. These histone-fold protein dimers combine within larger enzymatic complexes for DNA transcription, replication, and packaging.[supplied by OMIM]

Interactions
POLE3 has been shown to interact with SMARCA5.

References

Further reading